The 1962–63 Bulgarian Cup was the 23rd season of the Bulgarian Cup (in this period the tournament was named Cup of the Soviet Army). Slavia Sofia won the competition, beating Botev Plovdiv 2–0 in the final at the Vasil Levski National Stadium.

First round

|}

Second round

|}

Quarter-finals

|}

Semi-finals

|}

Final

Details

References

1962-63
Bulgarian Cup
Cup